The mesosphere is the region of Earth's atmosphere directly above the stratosphere, and directly below the mesopause.

Mesosphere may also refer to:

 Mesosphere (mantle), the region of the Earth's mantle just above the outer core
 Mesosphere (software), a data center operating system based on Apache Mesos, and a company by the same name
 Mesosphere, Inc., an American technology company based in San Francisco, California which develops software for data centers